Tropical Storm Kujira was a tropical cyclone that prompted the PAGASA to declare the beginning of the rainy season in the Philippines. The ninth tropical depression, 8th named storm, and first storm to make landfall on China in the 2015 Pacific typhoon season, it formed as a tropical depression south of the Paracel Islands on June 19.

Kujira caused 9 deaths in Vietnam due to flash flooding.

Meteorological history

The system began to organize, and on the next day at 06:00 UTC, the JTWC upgraded its development potential within the next day to medium. At 18:00 UTC, the Japan Meteorological Agency (JMA) began issuing warnings on a tropical depression that had formed to the south of the Paracel Islands.

On June 20 at 03:00 UTC, the JTWC issued a Tropical Cyclone Formation Alert on the system. On June 21 at 00:00 UTC, the JMA upgraded the depression to a tropical storm, assigning it the name Kujira. The convection became sheared to the southwest of the low-level circulation, and on June 22 at 03:00 UTC, the JTWC upgraded Kujira to a tropical storm. At 12:00 UTC, Kujira peaked in intensity, with maximum sustained winds of 50 mph (85 km/h) and a minimum central pressure of 985 hPa (mbar; 29.09 inHg) as it made landfall on Hainan. The JTWC briefly downgraded Kujira to a tropical depression as it entered the Gulf of Tonkin on June 23 at 03:00 UTC. Kujira briefly re-intensified before making its final landfall on north Vietnam on June 24 at 03:40 UTC; the JTWC issued its final warning on Kujira at 03:00 UTC. The JMA issued its final warning on Kujira at 18:00 UTC, dissipating 12 hours later.

Preparations and impact

Vietnam
22 thousand ships were notified of the presence of Kujira on June 21. 31 thousand personnel and over 1 thousand vehicles were mobilized to assist in emergencies. Landslides throughout the areas affected cut off several sections of highways and roads. Total losses caused by Kujira were about ₫385 billion (US$17.6 million) throughout the country.

China
Rainfall from Kujira eased the worst drought in Hainan since 1959. 40 thousand people were evacuated, and 162 flights were cancelled in Haikou Meilan International Airport and in Sanya Phoenix International Airport, which affected 11 thousand passengers. Heavy rainfall and gale-force winds affected Hainan, with high-speed trains between Haikou and Sanya being suspended. 40 thousand people were displaced and 20 thousand fishing boats returned to harbors, and elementary and middle schools in Haikou were suspended.

Hong Kong
On June 21 at 13:40 UTC, a Signal No. 1 warning was issued for Hong Kong, before being cancelled on the next day at 23:40 UTC. HK$1,570 (US$202) in damages were recorded in Hong Kong.

Elsewhere
Kujira enhanced the southwest monsoon in the Philippines, prompting the PAGASA to declare the beginning of the rainy season. Fishermen were warned of gale conditions in the Andaman Sea and in the Gulf of Thailand. Northeast Thailand experienced precipitation. Rainfall associated with Kujira brought flooding to parts of Myanmar.

See also 
 Tropical Storm Lionrock (2021) – took a similar path in October 2021

Notes

References

External links

JMA General Information of Tropical Storm Kujira (1508) from Digital Typhoon
JMA Best Track Data of Tropical Storm Kujira (1508) 
08W.KUJIRA from the U.S. Naval Research Laboratory

2015 Pacific typhoon season
Western Pacific tropical storms
Typhoons in Vietnam
Typhoons in China
Kujira